Brett Helm (born May 8, 1962 in Kansas City, Missouri) is a serial entrepreneur and off-road motorcycle racer. Helm is best known for co-founding  a series of networking hardware startup companies over the past two decades including IPivot, Coradiant, and DB Networks as well as for winning three SCORE International off-road motorcycle racing championships. Helm is the Chairman and CEO of DB Networks.

Career

United States Air Force
Helm entered the USAF in 1988. He attended Officer Training School at Lackland Air Force Base. He graduated from Flight Training School at Mather Air Force Base in 1989. As a B-52 aviator, he flew 26 combat missions in Operation Desert Storm and Desert Shield. Helm was awarded numerous commendations during his USAF career, including three Air Medals for combat flying.

Entrepreneur

Helm entered the business startup world as an early employee US West !NTERPRISE Networking Services. He later became an early employee of @Home Network, where he led the formation of @Work its vice president and general manager.
In 1997 Helm became a co-founder and CEO of IPivot. IPivot was an early innovator of Layer 7 load balancing and a pioneer in SSL acceleration/SSL offloading. Intel acquired IPivot in 1999 for $500 million. Intel appointed Helm to be the general manager of their newly created Network Equipment Division.
In 2000 Helm invested in Sanera Systems and assisted the company in obtaining their first two rounds of funding. Mcdata acquired Sanera Systems for $130 million in 2003.
Helm was a co-founder, investor, and Board member in Coradiant. Although Coradiant was professionally funded in 2000, Helm did not become an employee until 2005. Coradiant became the leader in End User Experience Management. BMC Software acquired Coradiant in April 2011 for $135 million. Helm is a co-founder and investor in DB CyberTech.

Investments

Helm invested in IPivot, Sanera Systems, Coradiant, DB CyberTech as well as multiple Venture Capital firms.

Off-road motorcycle racing

Helm is an off-road motorcycle racer. Helm began racing competitively in 2005. He races in a class for riders over 40 years old. He won three SCORE International off-road racing championships in 2007, 2008, and 2010. He competed in and won three prestigious Baja 1000 (Class 40) events in 2007, 2008, 2009. He raced at the famous Bonneville Salt Flats on a dirt bike exceeding 130 mph.

Off-road racing record

See also
 Venture capital
 Startup company
 Entrepreneurship
 Angel investor

References

External links
2011 Tecate SCORE Baja 1000 Face Sheet
Dust Off-Road Magazine

1962 births
American computer businesspeople
American technology chief executives
American investors
American technology company founders
Businesspeople from California
American chairpersons of corporations
Intel people
Living people
Off-road motorcycle racers
Recipients of the Air Medal
American venture capitalists
Utah State University alumni